Alondra may refer to:

 Alondra (TV series), a Mexican telenovela
 Alondra (given name)
 Alondra (shipwreck), an 1899 English steamer
 Dienogest, a progestin medication